Ed Stubbs (born 2 February 1989) is an Australian rugby union footballer. His regular playing position is either as a centre or a winger. He currently plays for the Western Force in Super Rugby.

Rugby career
Stubbs joined the Brumbies academy in 2009, and made his Super 14 debut for the Brumbies against the Cheetahs in Canberra in 2010. He went on to make three appearances during the season and signed a full contract with the franchise.
During 2010, Stubbs was selected in the Australian squad for the IRB World Sevens legs in Adelaide, Hong Kong, and also for London and Edinburgh, where the team finished first and second respectively.
Stubbs was unfortunately ruled out of the Australian Sevens squad for the 2011 Commonwealth Games due to an osteitis pubis injury. He was a member of the 2011 Brumbies squad but did not play a match during the season. He returned to Australian Sevens squad during the 2012 IRB World Sevens Series.

In 2013, Stubbs signed with the Western Force and played in his first game for team in the 16–14 win over the Crusaders.

Reference list

External links 
 

1989 births
Australian rugby union players
ACT Brumbies players
Western Force players
Male rugby sevens players
Rugby union centres
Living people
New South Wales Country Eagles players
People educated at Cranbrook School, Sydney